Playgirl was an American magazine that featured general interest articles, lifestyle and celebrity news, in addition to nude or semi-nude men. In the 1970s and 1980s, the magazine printed monthly and was marketed mainly to women, although it had a significant gay male readership.

History
The magazine was founded in 1973 by Douglas Lambert during the height of the feminist movement as a response to erotic men's magazines such as Playboy and Penthouse that featured similar photos of women. In 1977, Lambert sold Playgirl to Ira Ritter who took over as publisher. The magazine covered issues like abortion and equal rights, interspersed with sexy shots of men, and played a pivotal role in the sexual revolution for women. From March 2009 to February 2010, Playgirl appeared only online. The magazine returned to print as a sometime quarterly beginning with its March 2010 issue. The final print issue was Winter 2016. As of 2016, the magazine had only approximately 3,000 subscribers.

In 1986, Playgirl filed for Chapter 11 bankruptcy protection and was subsequently acquired by Drake Publishers, Inc. The magazine was published by Drake from 1986 until 1993 when Drake was merged into Crescent Publishing Group, Inc. In August 2000, Crescent was charged by the Federal Trade Commission with over $180 million of online credit card fraud, much of which was alleged by the FTC to have taken place on the playgirl.com website. In November 2001, for one of the then largest FTC settlements involving online credit card fraud, Crescent agreed to pay $30 million in refunds and to post a $2-million bond before it could continue to operate its websites. As a further condition for the settlement, Crescent principals Bruce A. Chew and David Bernstein were barred by the FTC from operating adult entertainment websites unless first posting bonds of $500,000 each. In December 2001, Crescent Publishing Group, Inc. changed its name to Blue Horizon Media, Inc. Following the FTC settlement, in 2003 then Crescent/Blue Horizon president Bruce Chew was indicted, along with alleged organized-crime figure Richard Martino and others on federal charges of conspiracy to commit wire fraud, credit-card fraud and money laundering for illegally billing web users including for the Playgirl website. Pursuant to a plea deal, Chew would later agree to testify for the government and against various of his co-defendants.

In August 2008, the magazine announced that it would cease publication of its print edition as of the January 2009 issue. After that point, the magazine planned to continue with an online-only edition. The last print issue was published in January/February 2009.

In February 2010, Playgirl announced it would re-launch issuing a print edition of the magazine. The first such issue would be the March 2010 issue available on newsstands as of February 22, 2010, carrying on its cover Levi Johnston, shot by longtime Playgirl photographer Greg Weiner. The magazine was issued approximately quarterly after that time.

Playgirl was published by New York City–based company Blue Horizon Media, Inc. until April 25, 2011, when Blue Horizon sold the print rights for Playgirl together with those of its other titles – High Society, Cheri, Black Diamond, Finally Legal, and Purely 18 – to Magna Publishing Group, Inc. of Paramus, New Jersey. The Playgirl.com website is owned and operated by BAOL LLC. In December 2015, Magna Publishing Group was acquired by 1-800-PHONESEX.

Target markets
The magazine was mainly marketed to heterosexual women. Despite this, in 2003, Playgirls then-editor-in-chief Michele Zipp admitted the magazine also attracted much gay readership. "It's 'Entertainment for Women' because there's no other magazine out there that caters to women in the way we do," she said. But she went on adding: "We love our gay readers as well, and the gay readership [of the magazine] is about 30%." In the same year, Mark Graff, President of Trans Digital Media, the brand management firm for Playgirl TV, stated that a large percentage of Playgirls readership are gay men.

Contents
Throughout the history of the magazine, Playgirl has featured male frontal nudity except for the early issues in 1973, and 1987 when John Paul became the year's first full frontal centerfold in November after ten months of non-nude photo spreads. Apart from professional models, Playgirl features amateur models in a section called Real Men (formerly known as Snapshots). A Real Men of the Year contest is held, in which readers can vote for the best layout of the year. In June of every year, Playgirl has its "Man of the Year" issue. In July, it is the "Country" issue; in November, Playgirl dedicates an issue to "Campus Hunks."

In a 2000 paper published in the International Journal of Eating Disorders, researchers examined 115 male centerfold models in Playgirl magazine from 1973 to 1997 and noted that the Playgirl centerfold models have become increasingly muscular over time.

Other versions
Playgirl is available in English and has been published in a number of other languages and international English-language editions during its history:
Germany (1978–1980 and 1989–2003)
France (1978)
Australia (1985–88) and as Interlude in 1991
Netherlands (1987–88)
United Kingdom (1992–93, 2011)
South Africa (1995)
Brazil (1985)
Russia (2004–2009)

When the Russian version of Playgirl was launched in June 2004, it contained photographs of nude, circumcised American men despite circumcision's being less common outside the U.S., being practiced mainly by Muslims and Jews in Russia.

Playgirl UK's brief 2011 relaunch was accompanied by an announcement that it would feature no below-the-waist nudity, and would focus on attractive male celebrities rather than models and pornography actors. It was a failure, and ceased circulation soon after it began.

A Spanish-language edition was published in 1992–1993.

Celebrity nudes
Playgirl has a monthly section entitled "Celeb Nudes" featuring photographs of various celebrities from film scenes, usually nude.

Since 2011
The Magna Publishing Group "secured the print rights" to Playgirl magazine in 2011.

In 2015, Playgirl asked Miguel Pimentel, a "bulging New York City Sheriff's deputy", to pose nude and offered $10,000 to any one who could get frontal nudes of Anderson Cooper.

See also

 Feminist pornography
 List of pornographic magazines#Marketed to heterosexual women
 List of women's magazines
 Media
 Naturism
 Sex-positive movement
 Sexual revolution
 Timeline of non-sexual social nudity
 Topfreedom
 Toplessness
 Women's Equality Day
 Young Naturists and Nudists America

References

Further reading
 Rivka Bukowsky, "Playgirl's hunks? The hairy, chubby & poor!", New York Daily News, August 17, 2005.
 Judy Cole, "Playgirl's Queer Canard", Nerve, November 27, 1997.

External links
 

Defunct women's magazines published in the United States
Magazines established in 1973
Magazines disestablished in 2016
Magazines published in California
Monthly magazines published in the United States
Pornographic women's magazines
Pornographic magazines published in the United States